Statistics of Czechoslovak First League in the 1982–83 season.

Overview
It was contested by 16 teams, and Bohemians Prague won the championship. Pavel Chaloupka was the league's top scorer with 17 goals.

Stadia and locations

League standings

Results

Top goalscorers

References

Czechoslovakia - List of final tables (RSSSF)

Czechoslovak First League seasons
Czech
1982–83 in Czechoslovak football